Bursaspor TV is a sports channel of Bursa based multi sports team Bursaspor.
The channel was launched in 2009 over satellite network services, cable service and streaming.

The television offers Bursaspor fans exclusive interviews with players and staff, full matches, including replays of all Süper Lig, Turkish Cup, and UEFA Cup games, in addition to vintage matches, footballing news, and other themed programming.

Commentators/Presenters
 Koray Kundakçılar
 Vedat Aslan
 Meltem Günaydın
 Saner Özgünay
 Ece Değirmenci
 Tolgahan Aydınlılar
 Erhan Tamiş
 Türker Kırpar
 Şenol Ulusavaş

Programs in Turkish
 Spor Merkezi
 Taraftarın Sesi
 Santra
 Haftaya Bakış
 Vizyondakiler
 Nereden Nereye
 O Maç
 Serbest Atış
 Gündem Dışı
 Haftanın Maçı
 Maç Günü
 Maçın Öyküsü
 Dünden Bugüne
 Vakıfköy Gündemi
 Çizgi Film Kuşağı
 Sağlıklı Günler
 Özlüce Günlüğü

References

External links
 
Youtube
  BURSASPOR TV 2009
SABAH.TR

Television stations in Turkey
Television channels and stations established in 2009
Turkish-language television stations
2009 establishments in Turkey
Sports television networks
Sports television in Turkey
Bursaspor